The 1910 Washington State football team was an American football team that represented Washington State College during the 1910 college football season. The team competed as an independent under head coach Oscar Osthoff, compiling a record of 2–3.

Schedule

References

Washington State
Washington State Cougars football seasons
Washington State football